Vejlby Stadium (Danish: Vejlby Stadion) is an association football facility in Risskov, Denmark. It is the home stadium of 3rd Division club VSK Aarhus which is a merger between the former tenants of the stadium, IK Skovbakken and Vejlby IK. Constructed in 1969, it is part of the sports complex, known as Vejlby-Risskov Sports Centre (Danish: Vejlby-Risskov Idrætscenter), owned by Aarhus Municipality.

Record attendance at Vejlby Stadium occurred on 7 September 1978, when IK Skovbakken faced local rivals AGF in the Danish Superliga, then called 1st Division. 11,763 spectators saw the home team lose 2–4.

References

 

Football venues in Denmark
Buildings and structures in Aarhus Municipality